History (known as Sky History in the UK and Ireland) is a European documentary television channel which broadcasts programs related to reality programming, historical events and persons.

It is a joint venture between  A&E Networks UK and Sky Group with localized channels across Europe. TVT Media is responsible for signal distribution in Europe, with local subsidiaries of A&E Networks as distribution representatives on the continent.

Programming across the channels is primarily in English and where available subtitled or dubbed into regional languages. The channel is available through a number of satellite, cable, terrestrial and IPTV distributors across Europe, the Middle East and South Africa. In some countries, advertisements and announcements between programs are localized.

On 6 November 2018, in the wake of the Disney-Fox merger, the European Commission required The Walt Disney Company to sell A&E's European channels, including History.

History has separate versions for Germany, Italy, the Netherlands, Spain and Portugal:

History Germany: Operated by A&E Networks Germany.
History Italy: Formerly a joint venture of A&E Networks and Fox International Channels Italy, it became a sole venture of A&E Networks in 2012.
History Netherlands, airing in the Netherlands and Flanders. Operated by A&E Networks Benelux.
Canal Historia (also known as História): The History Channel Iberia joint venture of A&E Networks and AMC Networks International Southern Europe.
History Poland - launched on April 9, 2008.

Sky History (UK and Ireland)
History Channel UK began on 11 November 1995 as a weekday three-hour block (4 to 7 pm), consisting of Biography (restyled for a British audience), History Alive and Our Century. The channel was A&E's first international venture.

Sky Sports 2 began broadcasting all day in 1997, requiring other networks to move to another channel. The History Channel shared transponder 24 with Sky Soap and the Sci-Fi Channel. The launch of Sky Digital allowed the channel to significantly increase its broadcast hours.

On 26 October 2006, History Channel HD launched in the United Kingdom and Ireland. The HD version was launching across Europe from October 2007, beginning in the  Nordic region on 13 December 2007, offering a  schedule separate from the standard-definition version. In January 2008, History Channel HD launched in the Netherlands. In November 2008 the History Channel was re-branded as History, and the high-definition channel became History HD.

The company behind the channel was known as The History Channel (UK) Limited until July 2009, when it was renamed AETN UK (a short form of "A&E Television Networks"). On 22 September 2011, AETN UK was re-branded A&E Networks UK. The channel launched on British Telecom on 15 August 2013, and on TalkTalk on 28 August 2014.

On 27 May 2020, History, History +1 and History 2 were renamed Sky History, Sky History +1, and Sky History 2 respectively, alongside the launch of Sky Documentaries and Sky Nature. The networks will retain strong ties with AETN, and the network's logos will retain the network's insignia, being co-marketed with Sky. The network also took a new channel position formerly held by E!.

History Scandinavia
The History Channel began in Scandinavia in September 1997, broadcasting for three hours daily on the analogue Viasat platform. Initially time-sharing with TV1000 Cinema, it was later moved to the Swedish TV8 channel until November 2004 (when Viasat launched Viasat History).

History Netherlands and Flanders
History Channel launched in the Netherlands and Flanders on 1 May 2007.

RTL Nederland (now Ad Alliance) became responsible for advertising sales on 1 January 2016. On 15 January 2021 Belgian provider Telenet moved the channel from their premium packages to the basic subscription. One day later, their subsidiary SBS Belgium announced they would handle Belgian advertising sales for the channel starting 1 February 2021.

History Germany
In German-speaking countries, History is operated by History Channel Germany, which was a joint venture of A&E Networks and NBC Universal Global Networks Germany. The channel began as the History Channel on 15 November 2004, and changed its name to History on 11 January 2009. Since 1 June 2017 the channel is fully owned by A&E Networks Germany.

History is available on the Kabel Deutschland, Kabel BW-Unitymedia, Primacom and KabelKiosk cable networks in all German states, and is also available on cable in Austria and Switzerland. Although the channel was available on satellite on Arena, it was not available on Premiere until the latter was renamed Sky on 4 July 2009. At that time, History HD (a high-definition version of the channel) was introduced. The channel hosts the annual History Award, which has been given since 2005.

History Channel Iberia (Spain and Portugal)

Since 1996, History has been distributed under the name Canal de Historia—and, more recently, História—in Spain and Portugal by AMC Networks International Southern Europe in a joint venture with A&E Networks (owner of History). The channel has Spanish and Portuguese feeds with dubbed English programs and locally produced programming.

História is available in Spain on Movistar+, cable networks (Telecable, R, Euskaltel), IPTV providers (Vodafone, Orange TV) and streaming media (TotalChannel). Historia HD became available in Spain on 3 November 2015. In Portugal, História is available through cable providers (NOS, Cabovisão) and IPTV (MEO, Vodafone).

Spanish locally produced programming
 Arqueólogo Por Un Día (2015), where a local celebrity spends a day working with archaeologists on an excavation 
 La Última Cena (2014–2015)

Portuguese local-history programming
 Combatentes do Ultramar (2003), dedicated to the Portuguese Colonial War 
 A Última Ceia (2014–2015)

References

 European Television Stream Online

External links
Official Site

 European Television Stream Online

1995 establishments in the United Kingdom
A&E Networks
AMC Networks International
Pan-Nordic television channels
Sky television channels
Television channels and stations established in 1995
Television channels and networks about history
Television channels in Belgium
Television stations in Denmark
Television channels in Flanders
Television stations in Germany
Television channels in Italy
Television channels in the Netherlands
Television channels in North Macedonia
Television stations in Portugal
Television stations in Spain
Television channels in the United Kingdom